The Taiyen Tongxiao Tourism Factory is an education center in Neidao Village, Tongxiao Township, Miaoli County, Taiwan, committed to promote education in salt and water technology.

Attractions
 Taiyen Museum
 Salt Ancestor Statue
 Ocean Foot Spa and Cafeteria
 Sales Center
 Cultural Creativity Salt Sculpture Area
 Solar Salt Processing Plant
 Drink Plant
 Electrodialysis Workshop
 Drying and Packaging Workshop
 Product Warehouse

Transportation
The center is accessible within walking distance south of Baishatun Station of Taiwan Railways.

See also
 List of museums in Taiwan

References

External links

 

Industry museums in Taiwan
Buildings and structures in Miaoli County